Shiling could refer to the following towns in China:

Shiling, Guangzhou (狮岭镇), in Huadu District
Shiling, Lianjiang, Guangdong (石岭镇)
Shiling, Laibin (石陵镇), in Xingbin District, Laibin, Guangxi
Shiling, Baoting County (什玲镇), in Baoting Li and Miao Autonomous County, Hainan
Shiling, Xiping County (师灵镇), Henan
Shiling, Suqian (侍岭镇), in Suyu District, Suqian, Jiangsu
Shiling (十岭村), Wulipu, Shayang, Jingmen, Hubei

See also
 Shieling, a hut, or collection of huts, once common in wild or lonely places in the hills and mountains of Scotland and northern England
 Shilling (disambiguation)
 Shilong (disambiguation)